Space M+A+X is a 1986 video game published by Final Frontier Software.

Gameplay
Space M+A+X is a game in which the moon is colonized and mined.

Reception
Johnny L. Wilson reviewed the game for Computer Gaming World, and stated that "MAX is a remarkable and fascinating simulation. It should be played by everyone who is even remotely interested in space exploration and/or hard science fiction. It should be savored by those of us who enjoy economic simulations."

Reviews
The Games Machine - Sep, 1989

References

External links
Review in Compute!
Review in Computer Play
Review in Aktueller Software Markt (German)

1986 video games